Branko Jovičić (born 18 March 1993) is a Serbian professional footballer who plays as a defensive midfielder for Austrian club LASK.

Club career

Borac Čačak
Jovičić made his professional debut with Borac Čačak. By the beginning of the 2013–14 Serbian First League season, Jovičić was the youngest captain in the team's history. At the end of the season, Borac finished second overall and was promoted to the SuperLiga. Jovičić spent a total of six years at Borac Čačak before his first transfer to Amkar Perm.

Amkar Perm
In August 2014, Jovičić signed a one-year contract with a provisional extension of two years for Russian team Amkar Perm. In his debut season with Amkar, Jovičić played 21 games and scored a total of three goals. As a result, Amkar gave Jovičić a pay increase after he agreed to extend his contract by two years.

Red Star Belgrade
On 8 July 2017, Jovičić signed a three-year contract with Serbian side Red Star Belgrade. He made his debut for new club in first leg of the second qualifying round for 2017–18 UEFA Europa League, in a 1–1 draw against Irtysh Pavlodar. Jovičić was elected for the player of the match in 2–0 win against the same rival, in the second leg. Jovičić suffered a metatarsal bone fracture after a bad tackle by Nikola Drinčić during the match against Čukarički on 6 August 2017. On 29 November 2017, Jovičić scored his first goal for Red Star in a 5–0 victory over Radnik Surdulica after taking a penalty kick. The following season, Jovičić helped Red Star qualify to the group stage of the UEFA Champions League for the first time in club history. Jovičić started in three matches, while coming in as a substitution in two. Later that season, he helped Red Star reach the final of the Serbian cup and win the league title for a second season in a row.
The following season, Jovičić would once again show why he had a place in Milojević's team. Unfortunately for him, an injury in the return leg in the second round against HJK Helsinki would see him on the sidelines for up to February 2020.

Ural Yekaterinburg
On 2 September 2020, he returned to Russia and signed with FC Ural Yekaterinburg.

LASK
On 5 February 2022, Jovičić signed a contract with LASK in Austria until 2025.

International career
Jovičić was called up to Serbian senior squad in September 2018, to play during the UEFA Nations League. He made his international debut on 11 October 2018, as a 72nd minute substitute against Montenegro in a 2-0 victory.

Personal life 
On 22 June 2020, he tested positive for COVID-19.

Career statistics

Club

Honours

Club
Red Star Belgrade
Serbian SuperLiga: 2017–18, 2018–19, 2019–20

References

External links
 

1993 births
People from Raška, Serbia
Living people
Serbian footballers
Association football midfielders
Serbia international footballers
FK Borac Čačak players
FC Amkar Perm players
Red Star Belgrade footballers
FC Ural Yekaterinburg players
LASK players
Serbian First League players
Serbian SuperLiga players
Russian Premier League players
Serbian expatriate footballers
Expatriate footballers in Russia
Serbian expatriate sportspeople in Russia
Expatriate footballers in Austria
Serbian expatriate sportspeople in Austria